"All die ganzen Jahre" ("All those years") is a song by Die Toten Hosen. It is the third single and the tenth track from the album Auf dem Kreuzzug ins Glück.

The narrator accidentally meets an old friend and is disappointed because the other doesn't care any more, although they've gone through a lot together.

There is also an English version of the song on Love, Peace & Money, titled "Wasted Years".

Music video
The video was directed by Walter Knofel. It shows the band performing in white dresses.

Track listing
 "All die ganzen Jahre" (Frege/Frege) − 3:18
 "Yeah, Yeah, Yeah" (Fife, Krupa, Reynolds, Rhythm) – 2:00 (The Rezillos cover)
 "Vor dem Sturm" (Before the storm) (Rohde/Frege) – 3:53
 "Altstadt hin und zurück" (Old town there and back) (Breitkopf, Frege, von Holst, Rohde/Breitkopf, Frege, von Holst, Rohde) – 2:11

1990 singles
Die Toten Hosen songs
Songs written by Campino (singer)
1990 songs
Virgin Records singles